Ilya Grad (born June 22, 1987) is an Israeli Muay Thai boxing champion. His current professional record stands at 35 wins with 16 knockouts, 13 losses and no draws. In 2010 he was  considered one of the eight best amateur Muai Thai boxers in the world. In February 2012, Grad won the WCK international title in China, In January 2013 the I-1 WMC world professional title in Hong Kong and in April WMC title in Singapore. Grad also made history by being the first known Israeli boxer to enter Malaysia under his Israeli passport.

Early life

Grad attributes much of his success to martial arts claiming that it led him away from the self-destructive path of bar fights in Jerusalem. He goes by the fight name “Achilles” in part, because of his fondness for Greek mythology and good looks.

Controversies
During the 2009 kick boxing championships in Bangkok, Grad met fellow kick boxer and Iranian kick boxing team captain Mostafa Abdollahi. Despite the political discourse between the respective countries, the two quickly became friends, began training together and acted as corner-men for each other. A Muay Thai Federation website published the story but removed it after Iranian protests.

In 2011, Grad became the first Israeli boxer to legally enter Malaysia after being invited to participate in the AXN Asia reality show, "The Challenger Muaythai" featuring various Muay Thai fighters from different countries. Malaysia, a predominantly Muslim nation, officially bans Israelis from entering the country. When he arrived at Kuala Lumpur airport, Grad was detained for 25 hours, but was finally allowed to enter the country following the intervention of the Malaysian Minister of Sports.
During his first bout, the show’s producers asked him to carry the Russian flag after his place of birth. He refused and stated that he would rather return home, after which the producers allowed him to proceed with the Israeli flag. When he entered the ring, the local audience booed him. He was matched against French fighter, Antoine Pinto but lost in a split decision. The two Malaysian judges voted against Grad while the Thai judge voted in his favor. Grad believed he had won the fight as did his corner-men and believed that politics played a role in the decision making process.
I threw an upper elbow to meet his movement and cut him over the eyebrow. As I saw the blood pouring down his face I rushed forward and in the clinch I used big elbows and saw a big lump growing slowly over his forehead. The round was totally mine and my strategy proved to be effective. For the rest of the fight I claimed the center of the ring and Antoine was mostly on the ropes, working the middle kicks. The fight was close, but not hard. I was never physically hurt, I never lost my power and I was never on the ropes on the defensive side. I felt in control throughout the entire match. 
After the fight, Grad was approached by audience members who apologized for jeering him and informed him that they thought he had won the fight.

Awards
 Israeli champion 2006/2007/2008/2009
 Baltic champion 2007
 IFMA world championships 3rd place winner 2009
 IFMA Asia champion 2010
 I-1 Grand Slam 2011 runner up
 WCK pro International Champion 2012
 Kings Trophy 2012 semi finalist
 Toyota Cup 2012 semi finalist
 I-1 World Champion 2013
 WMC World Champion 2013

In April 2012, Shalom Life ranked him Number 1 on its list of “the 50 most talented, intelligent, funny, and gorgeous Jewish men in the world.”

Fight record

|-  style="background:#c5d2ea;"
| 2018-12-01 || No Contest ||align=left| Jimmy Vienot || Credissimo Golden Fight || Levallois-Perret, France || No Contest || 1 || 
|-
! style=background:white colspan=9 |
|-  style="background:#FFBBBB;"
| 2018-06-16 || Win ||align=left| Chujaroen Dabransarakarm || Topking World Series || Surat Thani, Thailand || KO || 3 || 3:00
|-  style="background:#CCFFCC;"
| 2018-05-20 || Win ||align=left| Chanchai Sittisukato || Real Hero || Bangkok, Thailand || KO || 1 || 0:38
|-  style="background:#CCFFCC;"
| 2018-05-20 || Win ||align=left| Yodpayak Sitsongpeenong || Real Hero || Bangkok, Thailand || Decision || 1 || 5:00
|-  style="background:#CCFFCC;"
| 2018-05-20 || Win ||align=left| Ricardo Braga || Real Hero || Bangkok,  Thailand || KO || 1 || 0:39
|-  style="background:#FFBBBB;"
| 2014-12-05 || Win ||align=left| Tengnueng Sitjaesairoong || 2014 King's Cup || Bangkok, Thailand || KO || 4 ||
|-  style="background:#CCFFCC;"
| 2019-12-05 || Win ||align=left| Robin Elite Fight Club || 2014 King's Cup || Bangkok, Thailand || Decision || 5 || 3:00
|-  style="background:#CCFFCC;"
| 2014-09-07 || Win ||align=left| Bradley Stephen || MAX Muay Thai || Pattaya, Thailand || Decision || 3 || 3:00
|-  style="background:#FFBBBB;"
| 2014-09-07 || Win||align=left| Chanchai Sittisukato || MAX Muay Thai ||  Pattaya, Thailand || Decision || 3 || 3:00
|-  style="background:#CCFFCC;"
| 2013-04-13 || Win ||align=left| Faizal Ramli || Muaythai Singapore Challenge || Singapore || Decision || 5 || 3:00
|-  style="background:#CCFFCC;"
| 2013-01-07 || Win ||align=left| Faizal Ramli || WMC I-1 World Muay Thai Grand Extreme 2013 || Hong Kong || TKO || 2 ||
|-  style="background:#CCFFCC;"
| 2013-01-07 || Win ||align=left| Sebastian Harms-Mendez || WMC I-1 World Muay Thai Grand Extreme 2013 || Hong Kong || TKO || 2  ||
|-  style="background:#FFBBBB;"
| 2012-04-03 || Loss ||align=left| Jordan Watson || The Royal Trophy ||  Bangkok, Thailand || Decision || 3 || 3:00
|-  style="background:#CCFFCC;"
| 2011-12-19 || Win||align=left| M-100 Sitpholek || WMC I-1 Grand Xtreme 2011 ||  Hong Kong || Decision || 3 || 3:00
|-  style="background:#FFBBBB;"
| 2011-12-19 || Loss||align=left| Vuyisile Colossa || WMC I-1 Grand Xtreme 2011 ||  Hong Kong || Decision || 3 || 3:00
|-  style="background:#FFBBBB;"
| 2011-09-17 || Loss||align=left| Antoine Pinto || The Challenger Muay Thai ||  Kuala Lumpur, Malaysia ||  Decision || 3 || 3:00
|-  style="background:#FFBBBB;"
| 2006-04-08 || Loss||align=left| Mohamed Bourkhis || La Nuit des Superfights IV ||  Paris, France || Decision  || 5 || 3:00
|-
| colspan=9 | Legend:

See also
List of select Jewish mixed martial artists

References

Israeli male kickboxers
Israeli Muay Thai practitioners
Israeli Jews
1987 births
Living people
Jewish martial artists
Russian Jews